Justice Summers may refer to:

Augustus N. Summers, associate justice of the Ohio Supreme Court
Hardy Summers, associate justice of the Oklahoma Supreme Court

See also
Increase Sumner, associate justice of the Massachusetts Supreme Judicial Court